The Communist Party of the Russian SFSR may refer to:

 A name associated with the Communist Party of the Soviet Union which was known as Russian Social Democratic Labour Party (Bolsheviks) (1912–1918) and Russian Communist Party (Bolsheviks) (1918–1925)
 Communist Party of the Russian Soviet Federative Socialist Republic (Russian SFSR) or Communist Party of the Russian SFSR established in 1990 as a Russian republican branch of Communist Party of the Soviet Union